Kiss Madiam is a four-piece male group that won the second season of the Greek version of the Got Talent series, Ellada Eheis Talento.

Kiss Madiam take popular songs and change the lyrics to something funny, essentially satirising. Some of their songs are "Dolce Gabbana" (based on "Baila Morena") and "Diakopes" (based on the Scorpions song "Holiday", from their 1979 album Lovedrive).

Greek musical groups
Got Talent winners